Onley may refer to:
 
 Onley, Virginia, a town in Accomack County, Virginia, United States
 Onley (lost settlement), a lost village in Northamptonshire, England
 Onley (HM Prison), a Category C men's prison in Warwickshire, England

See also 
 Only (disambiguation)
 Olney (disambiguation)